Competition is any rivalry between two or more parties.

Competition may also refer to:
 Competition (economics), competition between multiple companies, i.e. two or more businesses competing to provide goods or services to another party
 Competition (biology), interaction between living things in which the fitness of one is lowered by the presence of another
 Competition (film), a 1915 short film directed by B. Reeves Eason
 "Competition" (The Spectacular Spider-Man), an episode of the animated television series The Spectacular Spider-Man
 Competition, Missouri, United States, a town in south-central Missouri, about 50 miles northeast of Springfield
 Chatham, Virginia, formerly named Competition, a town in Pittsylvania County, Virginia, United States
 "Competition", a 2013 song by Little Mix from Salute

See also
 The Competition (disambiguation)